David Ho (born 1952) is a Taiwanese American AIDS researcher

David Ho may also refer to:

 David Ho (artist), Chinese-American artist
 David Ho (businessman) (born c. 1953), Vancouver-based entrepreneur originally from Hong Kong, founder of Harmony Airways
 David Ho (oceanographer), American oceanographer and founder of Bamboo Bike Project
 David Ho Sue San (born 1949), Malaysia Chinese pharmaceutical entrepreneur